T'Pau may refer to:
 T'Pau (Star Trek), a character in the Star Trek universe
 T'Pau (band), a British musical group from the late 1980s
 T'Pau (album), the US title for the T'Pau album Bridge of Spies

See also
 T'pau Almandar, a character from Daniel Keys Moran's novel The Ring

de:T'Pau